This was the first edition of the tournament.

Yannick Hanfmann won the title after defeating Lorenzo Sonego 6–4, 3–6, 7–5 in the final.

Seeds

Draw

Finals

Top half

Bottom half

References
Main Draw
Qualifying Draw

Wolffkran Open - Singles
2017 Singles